Michael Hofmann (born 23 April 1971) is a retired Swiss football defender.

References

1971 births
Living people
Swiss men's footballers
FC Sion players
FC Bulle players
Yverdon-Sport FC players
Association football defenders
Swiss Super League players